Pseudoskenella is a genus of sea snails, marine gastropod mollusks in the family Pyramidellidae, the pyrams and their allies.

Species
Species within the genus Pseudoskenella include:
 Pseudoskenella depressa Ponder, 1973

References

External links
 To World Register of Marine Species

Pyramidellidae
Monotypic gastropod genera
Taxa named by Winston Ponder